Railway Interiors Expo is an annual industry show held in November, in varying locations. Organised by UKIP Media & Events the show has become a major event for the railway business since it was launched in 2004 and now visitors from over 60 countries attend.

Exhibitors at the Railway Interiors Expo offer a range of products and services related to train interiors, everything from seating and lighting to floor finishes and textiles, food service equipment, Wi-Fi, in-train entertainment systems, to highlight only a few.

Railway Interiors Expo is typically visited by genuine industry individuals, creating a beneficial opportunity for exhibitors to find new business opportunities, globally and at the same time providing all participants with a networking opportunity.

2011
In 2011, Railway Interiors Expo will take place in hall 9 of the Koelnmesse trade fair and exhibition center located in Cologne, Germany. The expo will run from 15 to 17 November and will include over 100 exhibitors.

In 2011 Railway Interiors Expo will feature a free to attend Design & Technology forum and an Awards for Innovation & Excellence ceremony.

References

External links 
 railway interiors expo website

Rail industry
Trade fairs
Recurring events established in 2004